Jasimuddin (1 January 1903 – 14 March 1976), popularly called Palli Kabi, was a Bengali poet, lyricist, composer and writer widely celebrated for his modern ballad sagas in the pastoral mode. Although his full name is Jasim Uddin Mollah, he is known as Jasim Uddin. His Nakshi Kanthar Math and Sojan Badiar Ghat are considered among the best lyrical poems in the Bengali language. He is the key figure for the revivals of pastoral literature in Bengal during the 20th century. As a versatile writer, Jasimuddin wrote poems, ballads, songs, dramas, novel, stories, memoirs, travelogues, etc.

Born in Faridpur, Jasimuddin was educated at Culcutta University where he also worked as Ramtanu Lahiri assistant research fellow under Dinesh Chandra Sen from 1931 to 1937. In 1938, he joined the University of Dhaka and taught there for 5 years. In 1944, he joined the Department of Information and Broadcasting of the then government and retired in 1962.

"An ardent supporter of socialism" and Bengali language movement, Jasimuddin was "one of the pioneers of the progressive and non-communal cultural movement" during 1950s and 1960s. He was awarded the President's Award for Pride of Performance in 1958, Ekushey Padak in 1976 and Swadhinata Dibas Puruskar posthumously in 1978. He rejected Bangla Academy Award in 1974.

In January 2018, Bangla Academy announced Jasimuddin Literary Award, a biennial award to be given for life-time contribution to Bangla literature.

Early life and career

Jasimuddin was born in the village of Tambulkhana in Faridpur District on 1 January 1903 in his maternal uncle's house. His father, Ansaruddin Mollah, was a school-teacher. His mother, Amina Khatun (Rangachhut) received early education at Faridpur Welfare School. He matriculated from Faridpur Zilla School in 1921. Jasimuddin completed IA from Rajendra College  in 1924. He obtained his BA degree in Bengali from the University of Calcutta in 1929 and his MA in 1931. From 1931 to 1937, he worked with Dinesh Chandra Sen as a collector of folk literature. Jasimuddin is one of the compilers of Purbo-Bongo Gitika (Ballads of East Bengal). He collected more than 10,000 folk songs, some of which has been included in his song compilations Jari Gaan and Murshida Gaan. He also wrote voluminously on the interpretation and philosophy of Bengali folklore.

Jasimuddin joined the University of Dhaka in 1938 as a lecturer. He left the university in 1944 and then worked at the Department of Information and Broadcasting until his retirement in 1962 as the deputy director.

Poetry
Jasimuddin started writing poems at a young age. As a college student, he wrote the celebrated poem Kabar (The Grave), a simple tone to obtain family religion and tragedy. The poem was placed in the entrance Bengali textbook while he was still a student of Calcutta University.

Jasimuddin is noted for his depiction of rural life and nature from the viewpoint of rural people. This had earned the title as Palli Kabi (the rural poet). The structure and content of his poetry bear a strong flavor of Bengal folklore. His Nakshi Kanthar Math (Field of the Embroidered Quilt) and Sojan Badiar Ghat (Gypsy Wharf) is considered two masterpieces and has been translated into many different languages.

Jasimuddin was introduced with Abbas Uddin by poet Golam Mostofa in a musical program held in Kolkata in 1931.

Major honors and awards
 President's Award for Pride of Performance, Pakistan (1958)
 DLitt. by Rabindra Bharati University, India (1969)
 Ekushey Padak (1976)
 Independence Day Award (1978)

Personal life
Jasimuddin was married to Begum Mamtaz Jasimuddin (d. 2006). Together they had three sons, Kamal Anwar Hashu, Firoz Anwar and Khurshid Anwar, and two daughters, Begum Hasna Moudud and Asma Elahi. Hasna is the wife of politician Moudud Ahmed. Asma is married to Tawfiq-e-Elahi Chowdhury.

Death and legacy

Jasimuddin died on 14 March 1976 and was buried near his ancestral home at Gobindapur, Faridpur. A fortnightly festival known as Jasim Mela is observed at Gobindapur each year in January commemorating his birthday.

Major works
Poetry
{{columns-list|colwidth=20em|
 Rakhali (1927)
 Nakshi Kanthar Math (1929)
 Baluchor (1930)
 Dhankhet (1933)
 Sojan Badiar Ghat (1933)
 Hashu (1938)
 Rupobati (1946)
 Matir Kanna (1951)
 Sakina (1959)
 Suchayani (1961)
 Bhayabaha Sei Dingulite (1972)
 Ma je Jononi Kande(1963)
 Holud Boroni (1966)
 Jole Lekhon (1969)
 Padma Nadir Deshe (1969)
 Beder Meye (1951)
 Kafoner Michil (1978)
 Maharom"
 Dumokho Chand Pahari (1987)
}}
Drama

NovelBoba Kahini'' (1964)

Memoirs

Travelogues

Music books

Others

Song titles

Gallery

See also

 List of Bangladeshi Poets

References

External links
 Official website of Jasimuddin foundation
 An article on the Jasimuddin's centenary

1903 births
1976 deaths
People from Faridpur District
University of Calcutta alumni
Academic staff of the University of Dhaka
Bengali male poets
Bangladeshi male poets
20th-century Bangladeshi poets
20th-century Bengali poets
Bengali-language poets
Bengali-language writers
Recipients of the Ekushey Padak
Recipients of the Independence Day Award
Recipients of the Pride of Performance
Honorary Fellows of Bangla Academy
20th-century Bangladeshi male writers